Sonia is a genus of moths belonging to the subfamily Olethreutinae of the family Tortricidae.

Species
Sonia canadana McDunnough, 1925
Sonia comstocki Clarke, 1952
Sonia constrictana (Zeller, 1875)
Sonia divaricata Miller, 1990
Sonia filiana (Busck, 1907)
Sonia paraplesiana Blanchard, 1979
Sonia vovana (Kearfott, 1907)

See also
List of Tortricidae genera

References

External links
tortricidae.com

Eucosmini
Tortricidae genera